Saint Vincent and the Grenadines is an island country in the Caribbean. It is located in the southeast Windward Islands of the Lesser Antilles, which lie in the West Indies at the southern end of the eastern border of the Caribbean Sea where the latter meets the Atlantic Ocean.

Its  territory consists of the main island of Saint Vincent and, south of that, two-thirds of the northern part of the Grenadines, a chain of 32 smaller islands. Some of the Grenadines are inhabited—Bequia, Mustique, Union Island, Canouan, Petit Saint Vincent, Palm Island, Mayreau, Young Island—while others are not: Tobago Cays, Baliceaux, Battowia, Quatre, Petite Mustique, Savan and Petit Nevis. Most of Saint Vincent and the Grenadines lies within the Hurricane Alley.

To the north of Saint Vincent lies Saint Lucia, to the east is Barbados, and Grenada lies to the south. Saint Vincent and the Grenadines has a population density of over 300 inhabitants/km2 (700 per sq mi), with approximately  total inhabitants.

Kingstown is the capital and main port. Saint Vincent has a British colonial history, and is now part of the Organisation of Eastern Caribbean States, CARICOM, the Commonwealth of Nations, the Bolivarian Alliance for the Americas and the Community of Latin American and the Caribbean States (CELAC).

In April 2021, the La Soufrière volcano erupted several times with "explosive events" continuing. By 12 April, 16,000 residents had evacuated the areas of their homes. Assistance and emergency financial support was being provided by several nearby islands, the United Kingdom and agencies such as the United Nations. The first significant offer of long-term funding, of US$20 million, was announced on 13 April 2021 by the World Bank.

Etymology
Christopher Columbus, the first European to reach the island, named it after St. Vincent of Saragossa (San Vicente de Zaragoza) whose feast day was on the day Columbus first saw it (22 January 1498). The name of the Grenadines refers to the Spanish city of Granada, but to differentiate it from the island of the same name, the diminutive was used. Before the arrival of the Spaniards, the Kalinago natives who inhabited the island of St. Vincent called it Youloumain, in honour of Youlouca, the spirit of the rainbows, who they believed inhabited the island.

History

Pre-colonial period
Before the arrival of Europeans and Africans in the 16th century, various Amerindian groups passed through or settled on St. Vincent and the Grenadines, including the Ciboney, Arawak, and Kalinago people. The island now known as Saint Vincent was originally named Youloumain by the native Island Caribs who called themselves Kalina/Carina ("l" and "r" being pronounced the same in their language).

European arrival and early colonial period 
It is thought that Christopher Columbus sighted the island in 1498, giving it the name St Vincent. The indigenous Garifuna people, who became known as the "Black Caribs", aggressively prevented European settlement on Saint Vincent.

French and British colonisation and the First Kalinago War 
Various attempts by the English and Dutch to claim the island proved unsuccessful, and it was the French who were first able to colonise the island, settling in the town of Barrouallie on the leeward side of St Vincent in 1719. The French brought with them enslaved African prisoners of war to work the plantations of sugar, coffee, indigo, tobacco, cotton and cocoa.

The British captured the island and drove out the French from Barrouallie during the Seven Years' War, a claim confirmed by the Treaty of Paris (1763). On taking control of the island in 1763, the British laid the foundations of Fort Charlotte and also brought with them enslaved African prisoners of war to work on the island plantations. The Black Caribs however, opposed to the British presence, entered into open conflict against the British, starting the First Carib War, which lasted from 1772 to 1773.

During the Anglo-French War (1778–1783), the French recaptured St Vincent in 1779. However, the British regained control under the Treaty of Versailles (1783).

British colonial period and the Second Kalinago War 

The uneasy peace between the British and the Black Caribs led to the Second Carib War, which lasted from 1795 to 1796. The Black Caribs were led by Garifuna Paramount Chief Joseph Chatoyer and supported by the French, notably the radical Victor Hugues from the island of Martinique. Their revolt and the uprising was eventually put down in 1797 by British General Sir Ralph Abercromby; a peace treaty agreement was made which resulted in almost 5,000 Black Caribs being exiled to Roatán, an island off the coast of Honduras, and to Belize and Baliceaux in the Grenadines.
 
In 1806, the construction of Fort Charlotte has completed.

The La Soufrière volcano erupted in 1812, resulting in considerable destruction.

The British abolished slavery in Saint Vincent (as well as in all other British West Indies colonies) in 1834, and an apprenticeship period followed which ended in 1838. After its end, labour shortages on the plantations resulted, and were initially addressed by the immigration of indentured servants; in the late 1840s, many Portuguese immigrants arrived from Madeira, and between 1861 and 1888 shiploads of Indian labourers arrived.

20th century

In 1902, the La Soufrière volcano erupted again, killing 1,500–2,000 people; much farmland was damaged, and the economy deteriorated.

Saint Vincent and the Grenadines passed through various stages of colonial status under the British. A representative assembly was authorised in 1776, Crown Colony government was installed in 1877, a legislative council was created in 1925 with a limited franchise, and universal adult suffrage was granted in 1951. During the period of its control of Saint Vincent and the Grenadines, Britain made several attempts to unify the island with the other Windward Islands as a single entity, to simplify British control in the sub-region through a single unified administration. In the 1960s, the British again tried to unify all of its regional islands, including Saint Vincent, into a single politically unified entity under British control. The unification was to be called the West Indies Federation and was driven by a desire to gain independence from the British government. However, the attempt collapsed in 1962.

Saint Vincent was granted "associate statehood" status by Britain on 27 October 1969. This gave Saint Vincent complete control over its internal affairs but fell short of full independence in law.

In April 1979, La Soufrière erupted once more. Although no one was killed, thousands were evacuated and extensive agricultural damage occurred.

On 27 October 1979, Saint Vincent and the Grenadines gained full independence; the date is now the country's Independence Day, a public holiday. The country opted to remain within the Commonwealth of Nations, retaining the then-Queen Elizabeth II as Monarch, represented locally by a Governor-General.

Post-independence era

Milton Cato of the centre-left Saint Vincent Labour Party (SVLP) was the country's first Prime Minister (he had been Premier since 1974), ruling until his defeat in the 1984 Vincentian general election by James Fitz-Allen Mitchell of the centre-right New Democratic Party (NDP). During Cato's time in office, there was a brief rebellion on Union Island in December 1979 led by Lennox 'Bumba' Charles. Inspired by the recent revolution on Grenada, Charles alleged neglect of the Union by the central government. However, the revolt was swiftly put down and Charles was arrested. There were also a series of strikes in the early 1980s. James Mitchell remained Prime Minister for 16 years until 2000, winning three consecutive elections. Mitchell was at the forefront of attempts to improve regional integration. In 1980 and 1987, hurricanes damaged many banana and coconut plantations. Hurricane seasons were also very active in 1998 and 1999, with Hurricane Lenny in 1999 causing extensive damage to the west coast of the island.

In 2000, Arnhim Eustace became Prime Minister after taking over the leadership of the NDP following Mitchell's retirement; he was defeated a year later by Ralph Gonsalves of the Unity Labour Party (successor party to the SVLP). Gonsalves—a left-winger known in the country as "Comrade Ralph"—argued that European nations owe Caribbean nations reparations for their role in the Atlantic slave trade. Gonsalves won a second term in 2005, a third in 2010, and a fourth in 2015.

In 2009, a referendum was held on a proposal to adopt a new constitution that would make the country a republic, replacing Queen Elizabeth II as head of state with a non-executive President, a proposal supported by Prime Minister Gonsalves. A two-thirds majority was required, but the referendum was defeated 29,019 votes (55.64 per cent) to 22,493 (43.13 per cent).

Saint Vincent and the Grenadines was elected as a non-permanent member of the United Nations Security Council 2020–21.

In November 2020, Ralph Gonsalves, Prime Minister of Saint Vincent and the Grenadines since 2001, made history by securing the fifth consecutive victory of his Unity Labour Party (ULP) in general election.

In 2021, on 9 April, the La Soufrière volcano erupted, sending ash several miles into the atmosphere. Approximately 16,000 people were evacuated in the days leading up to the eruption.

Geography

Saint Vincent and the Grenadines lies to the west of Barbados, south of Saint Lucia and north of Grenada in the Windward Islands of the Lesser Antilles, an island arc of the Caribbean Sea. The islands of Saint Vincent and the Grenadines include the main island of Saint Vincent  and the northern two-thirds of the Grenadines , which are a chain of smaller islands stretching south from Saint Vincent to Grenada. There are 32 islands and cays that make up St Vincent and the Grenadines (SVG). Nine are inhabited, including the mainland St Vincent and the Grenadines islands: Young Island, Bequia, Mustique, Canouan, Union Island, Mayreau, Petit St Vincent and Palm Island. Prominent uninhabited islands of the Grenadines include Petit Nevis, used by whalers, and Petit Mustique, which was the centre of a prominent real-estate scam in the early 2000s.

The capital of Saint Vincent and the Grenadines is Kingstown, Saint Vincent.

The island of Saint Vincent is volcanic and heavily forested and includes little level ground. The windward side of the island is very rocky and steep, while the leeward side has more sandy beaches and bays. Other major mountains on St Vincent are (from north to south) Richmond Peak, Mount Brisbane, Colonarie Mountain, Grand Bonhomme, Petit Bonhomme and Mount St Andrew.

The country is home to three terrestrial ecoregions: Windward Islands moist forests, Leeward Islands dry forests, and Windward Islands dry forests. It had a 2019 Forest Landscape Integrity Index mean score of 6.95/10, ranking it 61st globally out of 172 countries.

Government and politics

Saint Vincent and the Grenadines is a parliamentary democracy and constitutional monarchy, with Charles III as King of Saint Vincent and the Grenadines. He does not reside in the islands and is represented as head of state in the country by the Governor-General of Saint Vincent and the Grenadines, currently Susan Dougan (since 1 August 2019).

The office of Governor-General has mostly ceremonial functions including the opening of the islands' House of Assembly and the appointment of various government officials. Control of the government rests with the elected Prime Minister and their cabinet. The current Prime Minister is Ralph Gonsalves, elected in 2001 as head of the Unity Labour Party.

The legislative branch of government is the unicameral House of Assembly of Saint Vincent and the Grenadines, seating 15 elected members representing single-member constituencies and six appointed members known as Senators. The parliamentary term of office is five years, although the Prime Minister may call elections at any time.

The judicial branch of government is divided into district courts, the Eastern Caribbean Supreme Court and the Privy Council of the United Kingdom in London being the court of last resort.

Political culture 
The two political parties with parliamentary representation are the New Democratic Party (NDP) and the Unity Labour Party (ULP). The parliamentary opposition is made up of the largest minority stakeholder in the general elections, headed by the Leader of the Opposition. The current opposition leader is Godwin Friday.

Military 

Saint Vincent has no formal armed forces, although the Royal Saint Vincent and the Grenadines Police Force includes a Special Service Unit as well as a militia that has a supporting role on the island.

In 2017, Saint Vincent signed the UN treaty on the Prohibition of Nuclear Weapons.

Administrative divisions

Administratively, Saint Vincent and the Grenadines is divided into six parishes. Five parishes are on Saint Vincent, while the sixth is made up of the Grenadine islands. Kingstown is located in the Parish of Saint George and is the capital city and central administrative centre of the country.

LGBT rights

Acts of gross indecency, which may be defined to include homosexual activity, are illegal in Saint Vincent and the Grenadines. Section 148 of the Criminal Code states:
Any person, who in public or private, commits an act of gross indecency with another person of the same sex, or procures or attempts to procure another person of the same sex to commit an act of gross indecency with him or her, is guilty of an offence and liable to imprisonment for five years.

Foreign relations

International and regional relationships
Saint Vincent and the Grenadines maintains close ties to Canada, the United Kingdom and the US, and cooperates with regional political and economic organisations such as the Organisation of Eastern Caribbean States (OECS) and CARICOM. The island nation's sixth embassy overseas was opened on 8 August 2019 in Taipei, Taiwan, after Prime Minister Ralph Gonsalves' official visit to the Republic of China (Taiwan); the other five are located in London (a High Commission as Commonwealth countries have high commissions rather than embassies in each other's countries), Washington D.C., Havana, Caracas and Brussels.

The Double Taxation Relief (CARICOM) Treaty

On 6 July 1994 at Sherbourne Conference Centre, St Michael, Barbados, as a representative of the Government of St. Vincent and the Grenadines, then (James Mitchell, who was subsequently knighted) signed the Double Taxation Relief (CARICOM) Treaties. There were seven other signatories to the agreement on that day. The countries which were represented were Antigua and Barbuda, Belize, Grenada, Jamaica, St Kitts and Nevis, St Lucia, and Trinidad and Tobago.

An eighth country signed the agreement on 19 August 2016, Guyana. 

This treaty covered taxes, residence, tax jurisdictions, capital gains, business profits, interest, dividends, royalties and other areas.

FATCA
On 30 June 2014, St. Vincent and the Grenadines signed a Model 1 agreement with the United States of America with respect to Foreign Account Tax Compliance (Act) or FATCA.

According to the updated site as of 16 January 2017, on 13 May 2016 the agreement went to "In Force" status.

International and regional bodies to which St. Vincent and the Grenadines belong
St Vincent and the Grenadines is a member of the United Nations, the Commonwealth of Nations, the Organization of American States, and the Association of Caribbean States (ACS).

In September 2017, at the 72nd Session of the UN General Assembly, the Prime Ministers of the Solomon Islands, Tuvalu, Vanuatu and Saint Vincent and the Grenadines called for UN action on alleged human rights abuses committed on Western New Guinea's indigenous Papuans. Western New Guinea has been occupied by Indonesia since 1963. More than 100,000 Papuans have died during a 50-year Papua conflict.

In 2019, Saint Vincent and the Grenadines became the smallest country to ever be elected to the UN Security Council.

Organisation of American States
St Vincent and the Grenadines joined the Organisation of American States on 27 October 1981. It participates in the Summits of the Americas and the Indigenous Leaders Summits of Americas.

European nations
In 2013, Saint Vincent called for European nations to pay reparations for the slave trade.

Venezuela
Saint Vincent protests against Venezuela's claim to give full effect to Aves (Bird) Island, which creates a Venezuelan EEZ/continental shelf extending over a large portion of the Caribbean Sea.

Economy

Agriculture, dominated by banana production, is the most important sector of this lower-middle-income economy. The services sector, based mostly on a growing tourist industry, is also important. The government has been relatively unsuccessful at introducing new industries, and the unemployment rate remains high at 19.8% in the 1991 census to 15% in 2001. The continuing dependence on a single crop represents the biggest obstacle to the islands' development as tropical storms wiped out substantial portions of bananas in many years.

There is a small manufacturing sector and a small offshore financial sector serving international businesses; its secrecy laws have caused some international concern. There are increasing demands for international financial services like stock exchange and financial intermediaries financial activities in the country. In addition, the natives of Bequia are permitted to hunt up to four humpback whales per year under IWC subsistence quotas.

Tourism 
The tourism sector has considerable potential for development. The filming of the Pirates of the Caribbean movies on the island has helped to expose the country to more potential visitors and investors. Recent growth has been stimulated by strong activity in the construction sector and an improvement in tourism.

Transportation 
Argyle International Airport is the country's new international airport. The new facility opened on 14 February 2017, replacing the existing E.T. Joshua Airport. The airport is on the island's east coast about 8.3 km (5.17 miles) from Kingstown.

Communications

In 2010, Saint Vincent and the Grenadines had 21,700 telephone land lines. Its land telephone system is fully automatic, covering the entire island and all of the inhabited Grenadine islands. In 2002, there were 10,000 mobile phones. By 2010, this number had increased to 131,800. Mobile phone service is available in most areas of Saint Vincent as well as the Grenadines.

Saint Vincent has two ISPs (Digicel, Flow) that provide cellular telephone and internet service.

Demographics

The ethnic composition was 66% African descent, 19% of mixed descent, 6% East Indian, 4% Europeans (mainly Portuguese), 2% Kalinago and 3% others. Most Vincentians are the descendants of African people brought to the island to work on plantations. There are other ethnic groups such as Portuguese (from Madeira) and East Indians, both brought in to work on the plantations after the abolishing of slavery by the British living on the island. There is also a growing Chinese population.

Languages

English is the official language. Most Vincentians speak Vincentian Creole. English is used in education, government, religion, and other formal domains, while Creole (or 'dialect' as it is referred to locally) is used in informal situations such as in the home and among friends.

Religion
 
According to the 2001 census, 81.5% of the population of Saint Vincent and the Grenadines identified themselves as Christian, 6.7% has another religion and 8.8% has no religion or did not state a religion (1.5%).

Anglicanism constitutes the largest religious category, with 17.8% of the population. Pentecostals are the second largest group (17.6%). The next largest group are Methodists (10.9% of the population), followed by Seventh-day Adventists (10.2%) and Baptists (10.0%). Other Christians include Roman Catholics (7.5%), Evangelicals (2.8%), Church of God (2.5%), Brethren Christian (1.3%), Jehovah's Witnesses (0.6%) and the Salvation Army (0.3%).

Between 1991 and 2001 the number of Anglicans, Brethren, Methodists and Roman Catholics decreased, while the number of Pentecostals, Evangelicals and Seventh-day Adventists increased.

The number of non-Christians is small. These religious groups include the Rastafari (1.5% of the population), Hindus and Muslims (1.5%).

Culture

Sport

Cricket, rugby and association football are most popular among men whereas netball is most popular among women. Basketball, volleyball and tennis are also very popular.

The country's prime football league is the NLA Premier League, which provides its national (association) football team with most players. A notable Vincentian footballer is Ezra Hendrickson, former national team captain who played at several Major League Soccer clubs in the United States and is now a head coach with the Chicago Fire FC.

The country regularly participates at the Caribbean Basketball Championship where a men's team and a women's team compete. Saint Vincent and the Grenadines also has its own national rugby union team which is ranked 84th in the world. Other notable sports played at the regional level include track and field. Natasha Mayers won a gold medal in the 100m at the 2010 Commonwealth Games. Kineke Alexander won a bronze medal in the women's [400m] at the 2015 Pan American Games. Eswort Coombs got a bronze medal in the 400m at the 1995 Pan American Games.

Music

Music popular in Saint Vincent and the Grenadines includes big drum, calypso, soca, steelpan and reggae. String band music, quadrille and traditional storytelling are also popular. One of the most successful St Vincent natives is Kevin Lyttle. He was named Cultural Ambassador for the Island 19 September 2013.
The national anthem of Saint Vincent and the Grenadines is "Saint Vincent, Land so beautiful", adopted upon independence in 1979.

Media 
Saint Vincent has twelve FM radio stations: 88.9 Adoration Fm, 89.1 Jem Radio, 89.7 NBC Radio, 95.7 and 105.7 Praise FM, 96.7 Nice Radio, 97.1 Hot 97, 98.3 Star FM, 99.9 We FM, 103.7 Hitz, 102.7 EZee radio, 104.3 Xtreme FM and 106.9 Boom FM. There are several Internet radio stations including Chronicles Christian Radio. It has one television broadcast station ZBG-TV (SVGTV) and one cable television provider.

St Vincent and the Grenadines Broadcasting Corporation is the parent company for SVGTV, Magic 103.7.

Holidays

Notable people of Vincentian descent

21 Savage, Rapper
Lincoln Alexander, Lawyer
Judy Boucher, Reggae singer
Ashley Cain, Footballer
Dan Caplen, Singer-songwriter 
Problem Child, Soca musician/singer
Jamal Edwards, Entrepreneur
Skinny Fabulous, Soca musician/singer
Adonal Foyle, American basketball player
N'Keal Harry, American football player
Jesse Lingard, Footballer
Kevin Lyttle, Musician/singer
Nixon McLean, Cricketer
Mist, Rapper
OYABUN, Rapper
Nzingha Prescod, American Olympic fencer
Protoje, Reggae singer
Marlon Roudette, Singer-songwriter 
Franklyn Seales, television and motion picture actor
Sir Garfield Sobers, Cricketer
Cassie Ventura, Singer
Sophia Young, NCAA Champion and 3x WNBA All-Star
Ezra Hendrickson, MLS Player and now Head Coach of Chicago Fire

See also

Outline of Saint Vincent and the Grenadines
Index of Saint Vincent and the Grenadines-related articles

References

Further reading

 Bobrow, Jill & Jinkins, Dana. 1985. St. Vincent and the Grenadines. 4th Edition Revised and Updated, Concepts Publishing Co., Waitsfield, Vermont, 1993.
 Cosover, Mary Jo. 1989. "St. Vincent and the Grenadines." In Islands of the Commonwealth Caribbean: A Regional Study, edited by Sandra W. Meditz and Dennis M. Hanratty. US Government Printing Office, Washington, D.C.
 CIA Factbook entry
 Gonsalves, Ralph E. 1994. History and the Future: A Caribbean Perspective. Quik-Print, Kingstown, St Vincent.
 US Dept of State Profile
 Williams, Eric. 1964. British Historians and the West Indies, Port-of-Spain.

External links

 Government
 
 Website of the Prime Minister of St Vincent and the Grenadines
 Chief of State and Cabinet Members
 General information
 Saint Vincent and the Grenadines. The World Factbook. Central Intelligence Agency.
 Saint Vincent and the Grenadines from UCB Libraries GovPubs
 
 St Vincent and the Grenadines from the BBC News
 
 Key Development Forecasts for St Vincent and the Grenadines from International Futures
 Saint Vincent and the Grenadines Private Sector Assessment Report

 
Countries in the Caribbean
Island countries
Windward Islands
English-speaking countries and territories
Member states of the Caribbean Community
Member states of the Commonwealth of Nations
Member states of the Organisation of Eastern Caribbean States
Member states of the United Nations
States and territories established in 1979
Small Island Developing States
1979 establishments in North America
Countries in North America